Pyrops intricatus is a species of lantern bug, an insect in the family Fulgoridae, found in Borneo. It was originally described in 1857 by Francis Walker as Hotinus intricatus.

Description
Walker described the male of the species as follows:

Subspecies
Subspecies include:
 Pyrops intricatus albobasalis (Lallemand, 1960)
 Pyrops intricatus intricatus (Walker, 1857)

References

intricatus
Insects described in 1857